Wilhelm Johannes Verwoerd (born February 21, 1964) is a South African facilitator and researcher based at Stellenbosch University. The grandson of Hendrik Verwoerd, known as the architect of the apartheid regime, Verwoerd has disavowed the views with which his family is widely associated and joined the ANC.

Early life and education
Born in Pretoria to Wilhelm and Elise (née Smit) Verwoerd on 21 February 1964, Wilhelm is a member a prominent Afrikaner family. His grandfather was South African Prime Minister Hendrik Verwoerd. Although raised in a family and environment that frowned on racial integration, he changed his stance on apartheid after studying in Holland and at Oxford University.  For more detail on this journey see Verwoerd (2019).

He holds an MA in Philosophy from Stellenbosch University in 1989, an MA in PPE from the University of Oxford and a PhD in Applied Ethics from the University of Johannesburg.

Academic career and later life
Verwoerd's research focuses largely on reconciliation, forgiveness and apology, on which he has written several articles. He was a researcher in the Truth and Reconciliation Commission. He worked as a programme co-ordinator and a co-facilitator in Ireland, within the Glencree Centre for Peace and Reconciliation's Survivors and former Combatants Programme between 2002 and 2011. He is a former co-director of Beyond Walls Ltd. From 2019 he is a senior researcher and facilitator within Studies in Historical Trauma and Transformation, Stellenbosch University.

In 1992, Verwoerd formally joined the ANC, which drew a lot of criticism and threats from militant Afrikaners - given his family roots. This brought strife with his own family. Despite a strong Christian upbringing and a family who taught him to follow Christ, Wilhelm has left orthodox Christianity to practise a form of New Age Spiritualism. Neither his children nor his former wife is a Christian.

Personal life
Verwoerd married Melanie Fourie in 1987, with whom he had two children, Wilmé (born 1990) and Wian (born 1992). They divorced in 2005. Wilhelm later married his second wife Sharon.

Select publications

Books
Wilhelm Verwoerd (1996). Viva Verwoerd?: kronieke van 'n keuse. Human & Rousseau. 
Wilhelm Verwoerd (2018). Bloedbande: 'n Donker tuiskoms. Tafelberg.
 Wilhelm Verwoerd (2019). Verwoerd: My Journey through Family Betrayals. Tafelberg.

Edited books

Journal articles

References

External links
Is it time to forgive? - Dr Wilhelm Verwoerd
Dr. Wilhelm Verwoerd Speaks on Apartheid and Conflict Resolution

1964 births
South African Rhodes Scholars
South African social scientists
South African philosophers
South African political philosophers
Members of the African National Congress
Academic staff of Stellenbosch University
Alumni of the University of Oxford
University of Johannesburg alumni
Living people